Mahatma Gandhi University may refer to:

Mahatma Gandhi Central University, Bihar
Mahatma Gandhi Kashi Vidyapith, Uttar Pradesh
Mahatma Gandhi University, Kerala
Mahatma Gandhi University, Meghalaya
Mahatma Gandhi University, Nalgonda
Mahatma Gandhi University of Medical Sciences & Technology, Rajasthan
Mahatma Gandhi University, West Bengal